The Graves is an aggregation of rock outcroppings in Massachusetts Bay, Massachusetts, United States.

The island is privately owned and the beacon and foghorn are managed by the Coast Guard, and is not open to the public.

The Graves are named after Thomas Graves, a prominent early trader of colonial Massachusetts and a rear admiral in the English Navy who was killed in action against the Dutch in 1653.

The Graves are northeast of the Roaring Bulls and far northwest of Three and One-half Fathom Ledge. The Commonwealth of Massachusetts ceded jurisdiction of The Graves, which lay outside the jurisdiction of any town, to the Federal Government on April 22, 1903, so that a lighthouse could be built on the ledge. The United States Lighthouse Service operated Graves Light until 1939, when it was merged into the United States Coast Guard. Graves Light was declared surplus property and sold by auction to a private owner in 2013.

References

Boston Harbor islands
Islands of Massachusetts
Islands of Suffolk County, Massachusetts
Private islands of Massachusetts